Macedo-Romanians or Macedo-Romanian may refer to:

 The Aromanians, an Eastern Romance people inhabiting the Balkans, including the region of Macedonia
 The Aromanian language, the language of the Aromanians
 The Megleno-Romanians, another Eastern Romance people exclusively inhabiting the region of Macedonia
 The Megleno-Romanian language, the language of the Megleno-Romanians

Language and nationality disambiguation pages